Villasanta (La Santa) is a comune (municipality) in the Province of Monza and Brianza in the Italian region Lombardy, located about  northeast of Milan.

Villasanta borders the following municipalities: Arcore, Biassono, Monza, Concorezzo.

Comune  Villa San Fiorano existed  from 14. Century till 1757.

References

External links